Valerie and Her Week of Wonders is a novel by surrealist Czech writer Vítězslav Nezval, written in 1935 and first published ten years afterward in 1945. The avant-garde experimental novel was written before Nezval's dramatic shift to Socialist Realism. It was made into a 1970 Czech film directed by Jaromil Jireš, an example of Czech New Wave cinema. 

With this novel, Nezval explored the gothic themes and settings of such novels as Mary Shelley's Frankenstein (1818) and M. G. Lewis' The Monk (1796), as well as F. W. Murnau's film Nosferatu (1922; based on 1897 novel Dracula  by Bram Stoker).

The 2005 English edition features the illustrations by Kamil Lhoták that appeared in the original edition.

Adaptation 
The 1970 film adaptation Valerie and Her Week of Wonders, directed by Jaromil Jireš, with Jaroslava Schallerová as Valerie.

External links 
 
 

Gothic novels
Surrealist novels
Czech novels adapted into films
1945 novels